Dear God is a 1996 American comedy film distributed by Paramount Pictures, directed by Garry Marshall and starring Greg Kinnear and Laurie Metcalf.

The song of the same title by Midge Ure was used in the film's theatrical trailer and in the film itself.

Plot
Tom Turner, a con artist, is arrested for working cons he is presently doing to pay off his gambling debt to Junior, a loan shark. He is sentenced by the judge to find a full-time job by the end of the week and keep it for at least a year, or be sent to jail.

Tom finds work at the post office sorting mail in the dead letter office. Surrounded by quirky coworkers, Tom finds out what happens to letters addressed to the Easter Bunny, Elvis Presley, and God, and out of curiosity reads one of the letters sent to God.

While reading the letter, sent by a needy single mother, Tom accidentally drops his paycheck; it is mailed back to her. When Tom comes to retrieve his paycheck, he sees the good it has done and leaves, not knowing that Rebecca, a burnt-out workaholic lawyer coworker doing pro-bono work, has seen him doing so.

Believing Tom sent the money on purpose, Rebecca rallies the rest of the dead letter office workers to continue what Tom has started. Tom, becoming the unwilling leader of the group, starts answering more and more letters sent to the post office asking God for help. Hilarity ensues as the group answers more prayers, enriching people's lives, while Tom tries to find love with Gloria, a coffee bar waitress, and keep out of jail.

After the loan shark trashes Tom's apartment, things are replaced by 'God' or rather his coworkers. Webster, Junior's 'heavy', stops by to let him know that he was hit by a bus, so is off the hook for the loan.

Miraculously others begin to step up, replacing Christmas presents stolen from the Salvation Army, the Santa Monica homeless had canned goods delivered to them as requested, and 5,000 in cash comes in. Tom, believing it's a trap, suggests they lay low for a while.

The postmaster general announces on a news report that it is a federal offense for postal workers to open mail not addressed to them. The postal police show up to arrest Idris Abraham, as he took responsibility for giving a homeless man a trumpet.

Tom confesses, saying it was all him on TV. Rebecca, acting as his defense attourney, calls the other postal workers from the department. As she's making her closing statements Herman, fellow postal worker who sees she's losing, calls in postal carriers from throughout LA. They fill the streets around the courthouse demanding Tom be released.

The judges declares him not guilty, only holding him to complete the 12 months of work sentenced to him in the previous hearing.

Cast

Main cast

Uncredited cameos

Reception
Dear God received generally negative reviews from critics. Siskel & Ebert gave the film two thumbs down upon its release. James Berardinelli gave the film one star and explained, "At least after seeing this movie, I understand where the title came from – starting about thirty minutes into this interminable, unfunny feature, I began looking at my watch every few minutes and thinking, 'Dear God, is this ever going to end?' A sickeningly bad pastiche of much better pictures – It's a Wonderful Life, Miracle on 34th Street, and (believe it or not) Spartacus all leap to mind – Dear God is the worst excuse for a holiday film since Nora Ephron's hideous Mixed Nuts."

As of December 2020, film review aggregator Rotten Tomatoes had given the film a 12% positive rating, based on reviews from 34 critics. The consensus summarizes: "Dear God never had a prayer, with Greg Kinnear's angelic charisma weighted down by a screenplay bereft of wit but heavy on schmaltz."

References

External links
 
 
 
Dear God at Famous Clowns

1996 films
1996 comedy films
American comedy films
Films directed by Garry Marshall
Paramount Pictures films
Rysher Entertainment films
Films about con artists
Films about the United States Postal Service
1990s English-language films
1990s American films